Marie Joseph Pain (4 August 1773, Paris – March 1830, ibid.) was a 19th-century French playwright, poet and essayist.

Biography 
His plays, some of which achieved a major success, were presented on the most important Parisian stages of his time including the Théâtre du Vaudeville, the Théâtre du Gymnase-Dramatique, and the Théâtre des Variétés.

Works 
[[File:110-Elise Lindström som Fanchon-Svenska teatern 4.jpg|thumb|Elise Lindström in a Swedish adaptation of Fanchon the hurdy-gurdy girl]].

1792: Saint-Far, ou la Délicatesse de l'amour, comedy in 1 act, in verse
1794: Les Chouans, ou La Républicaine de Malestroit, with François Marie Joseph Riou de Kersalaün
1794: Le Naufrage au port, comedy in 1 act, mingled with vaudevilles
1798: Le Roi de pique, comedy in 1 act and in verse
1798: L'Appartement à louer, comedy épisodique mingled with vaudevilles
1799: Le Connaisseur, comedy in 1 act, mingled with vaudevilles
1799: La Marchande de plaisir, vaudeville in 1 act
1800: Florian, comedy in 1 act, in prose, mingled with vaudevilles, with Jean-Nicolas Bouilly
1800: Téniers, comedy in 1 act and in prose, mingled with vaudevilles, with Bouilly
1801: Allez voir Dominique, comedy in 1 act, mingled with vaudevilles
1802: Berquin, ou l'Ami des enfans, comedy in 1 act, in prose, mingled with vaudevilles, with Bouilly
1802: Le Méléagre champenois, ou la Chasse interrompue, folie-vaudeville in 1 act
1802: Le Procès, ou la Bibliothèque de Patru, comedy in 1 act, in prose, mingled with vaudevilles
1803: Fanchon la vielleuse, comedy in 3 acts, mingled with vaudeville, with Bouilly
1804: Théophile, ou les Deux poètes, comedy in 1 act and in prose, mingled with vaudevilles, with Théophile Marion Dumersan
1805: La Belle Marie, comédie-anecdote in 1 act, mingled with vaudevilles, with Dumersan
1805: Le Portrait du duc, comedy in 3 acts and in prose, with Ludwig Benedict Franz von Bilderbeck 
1806: Brutal, ou Il vaut mieux tard que jamais, vaudeville in 1 act and in prose, parodie of Uthal, with Pierre-Ange Vieillard
1806: Point d'adversaire, opéra comique in 1 act
1807: Amour et mystère, ou Lequel est mon cousin ?, comedy in 1 act, mingled with vaudevilles
1807: Laurette, opera in 1 act, music by Stanislas Champein
1808: La Chaumière moscovite, vaudeville anecdote in 1 act, with Dumersan
1808: Rien de trop, comedy in 1 act, in prose, mingled with vaudevilles
1809: Benoît ou Le pauvre de Notre Dame, comédie-anecdote in 2 acts and in prose, mingled with vaudevilles, with Dumersan
1809: Le Roi et le pèlerin, comedy in 2 acts and in prose, mingled with vaudevilles, with Dumersan
1809: Le Manuscrit déchiré, bagatelle (trifle) in 1 act, in prose
1810: Le Père d'occasion, comedy in 1 act, with Vieillard
1810: La Vieillesse de Piron, comedy in 1 act, in prose, mingled with vaudevilles, with Bouilly
1810: L'Homme de quarante ans, ou Le Rôle de comédie, comedy in 1 act, mingled with vaudevilles
1810: Encore une partie de chasse, ou le Tableau d'histoire, comédie-anecdote in 1 act, in verse, with Dumersan
1810: Deux pour un, comedy in 1 act mingled with vaudevilles, with Henri Dupin
1810: Rien de trop ou Les Deux paravents, opéra comique in 1 act, music by François-Adrien Boïeldieu
1811: Le Dîner d'emprunt, ou Les lettres de Carnaval, vaudeville in 1 act, with Dupin
1812: Les Mines de Beaujonc, ou Ils sont sauvés, fait historique in 3 acts, mingled with couplets, with Dumersan
1813: Les Rêveurs éveillés, parade magnétique in 1 act, mingled with vaudevilles, with Vieillard
1816: Le Revenant, ou l'Héritage, comédie-vaudeville in 1 act, in prose, with Dupin
1818: La Statue de Henri IV, ou la Fête du Pont-Neuf, tableau grivois in 1 act, with René de Chazet, Marc-Antoine Désaugiers and Michel-Joseph Gentil de Chavagnac
1819: Voyage au hasard
1820: Poésies de M. Joseph Pain
1823: Jenny la Bouquetière, opéra comique, with Bouilly
1826: Le Bonhomme, comedy in 1 act, mingled with couplets, with Pierre Carmouche and Antoine Simonnin
1828: Nouveaux tableaux de Paris, ou Observations sur les mœurs et usages des Parisiens au commencement du XIXe siècle, 2 vols
1844: Adieux à l'Aveyron, in Poésies aveyronnaises by Adrien de Séguret

Bibliography 
 Joseph-Marie Quérard, La France littéraire ou Dictionnaire bibliographique des savants, 1834, 
 Marie-Nicolas Bouillet, Dictionnaire universel d'histoire et de géographie, vol.2, 1867, 
 Charles Dezobry, Théodore Bachelet, Dictionnaire général de biographie et d'histoire, vol.2, 1873, 
 John Oxenford, The Book of French Songs, 1877, 
 Henry Gidel, Le vaudeville, 1986,

References

External links 
 Joseph Pain on Data.bnf.fr

19th-century French dramatists and playwrights
19th-century French poets
19th-century French essayists
1773 births
Writers from Paris
1830 deaths